Kacper Smoliński (born 7 February 2001) is a Polish professional footballer who plays as a midfielder for Pogoń Szczecin.

References

External links

2001 births
Living people
Polish footballers
Association football midfielders
Pogoń Szczecin players
Ekstraklasa players
III liga players
People from Police, West Pomeranian Voivodeship
Poland youth international footballers
Poland under-21 international footballers